The Arboretum de Fontenoy-le-Château (3 hectares) is an arboretum located on the route des Tuileries, Fontenoy-le-Château, Vosges, Grand Est, France. It is open daily without charge.

See also 
 List of botanical gardens in France

References 
 L'Echo des Chênaies entry 
 Sortir en Lorraine entry 
 Vanderkamp: La Fontaine Terreau description 
 French Wikipedia entry for Fontenoy-le-Château: :fr:Fontenoy-le-Château

Gardens in Vosges (department)
Fontenoy-le-Chateau